Türkdeniz Şevval Sam (born 11 November 1973) is a Turkish singer and actress. She is the daughter of Leman Sam, who is also a singer. She is known for her performance on Yasak Elma as Ender, and other TV series, including Süper Baba, Gülbeyaz, and Bodrum Masalı. With Gülbeyaz's co-star Nejat İşler  and Yasak Elma's co-star Murat Aygen, she played together in youth series "Bodrum Masalı" for two time.

Biography
Şevval Sam was born on 11 November 1973 in Istanbul to singer Leman Sam and musician Selim Sam. She has an elder sister named Şehnaz.

Şevval Sam went to high school in İsov Yapı Vocational High School and studied Fine Arts in the Graphic Design Department at Marmara University. 
She was married to footballer Metin Tekin between 1993 and 1999, and has a son, actor Taro Emir from this marriage.

Filmography

Theatre

Discography

References

External links
 Şevval Sam official website
 Şevval Sam page at Discogs.com
 Şevval Sam page at IMDB.com

1973 births
Living people
Turkish film actresses
Turkish television actresses
Actresses from Istanbul
20th-century Turkish actresses
21st-century Turkish women singers
21st-century Turkish actresses
Singers from Istanbul
Association footballers' wives and girlfriends